Anchylobela is a genus of snout moths. It was described by Alfred Jefferis Turner in 1947.

Species
Anchylobela haplodes Turner, 1947
Anchylobela phaulodes (Turner, 1947)
Anchylobela nitens (Butler, 1886)
Anchylobela dyseimata (Turner, 1913)
Anchylobela holophaea (Turner, 1905)
Anchylobela acidnias (Turner, 1904)

References

Anerastiini
Pyralidae genera